Luigi Druetti (1853–1919) was an Italian general. He was the governor of Tripolitania from November 1914 to February 1915.

At the beginning of World War I, he commanded the 5th division of corprs III.

Notes

1853 births
1919 deaths
Italian colonial governors and administrators
Italian military personnel of World War I
Italian generals